Robert Michael Jeter (August 26, 1952 – March 30, 2003) was an American actor. His television roles included Herman Stiles on the sitcom Evening Shade from 1990 until 1994 and Mr. Noodle's brother, Mister Noodle, on the Elmo's World segments of Sesame Street from 2000 until 2003. Jeter's film roles include Zelig, Tango & Cash, The Fisher King, Sister Act 2: Back in the Habit, 
Waterworld, Air Bud, Mouse Hunt, Patch Adams, The Green Mile, Jurassic Park III, Welcome to Collinwood, Open Range, and The Polar Express.

Early life
Jeter was born Robert Michael Jeter in Lawrenceburg, Tennessee on August 26, 1952. His mother, Virginia (née Raines; May 6, 1927 – May 21, 2019), was a housewife. His father, William Claud Jeter (March 10, 1922 – March 1, 2010), was a dentist. Jeter had one brother, William, and four sisters, Virginia, Amanda, Emily, and Lori. Jeter was a student at Memphis State University (now the University of Memphis) when his interests changed from medicine to acting. He performed in several plays and musicals at the Circuit Theatre and its sister theatre, the Playhouse on the Square, in midtown Memphis. He left Memphis to further pursue his stage career in Baltimore, Maryland.

Career
Jeter's woebegone look, extreme flexibility, and high energy led Tommy Tune to cast him in the off-Broadway play Cloud 9 in 1981.  Much of his work specialized in playing eccentric, pretentious, or wimpy characters, as in The Fisher King, Waterworld, Fear and Loathing in Las Vegas, The Green Mile and Drop Zone. Occasionally, Jeter was able to stray from type for more diverse characters, such as those he portrayed in Jurassic Park III, Air Bud, and Open Range. Jeter is perhaps most known for his role as convicted felon Eduard Delacroix in The Green Mile, a role for which he was nominated along with the rest of the cast for a Screen Actors Guild Award.

In The Fisher King, Jeter portrayed "an unnamed homeless cabaret singer", and "shimmies across the screen with boundless confidence, turning what might have been a grotesque, or at least merely humorous, part into something noble, even indomitable... In a film unafraid of big acting, Jeter goes bigger than anyone."

He also played Mr. Noodle's brother, Mister Noodle, on Sesame Street from 2000 to 2003.  He appeared in an episode of Touched by an Angel in 1999 as Gus, an insurance salesman who arrives in Las Vegas, in the episode "The Man Upstairs".  His last two appearances were in the films Open Range and The Polar Express. Both films were in post-production at the time of his death and, when released, contained a dedication to his memory. The season 35 premiere of Sesame Street, a special entitled "The Street We Live On", was similarly dedicated to Jeter.

Awards
In 1990, Jeter won a Tony Award for his performance in the Broadway musical Grand Hotel. He won an Emmy Award in 1992 for his role in the television sitcom Evening Shade as math teacher and assistant football coach Herman Stiles. He also received an Outer Critics Circle Award, Drama Desk Award, and the Clarence Derwent Prize.

Personal life
Jeter was gay and met his partner, Sean Blue, in 1995; they were together until Jeter's death in 2003.

Jeter was HIV positive and disclosed his diagnosis in a 1997 interview on Entertainment Tonight. Despite this, he remained healthy for many years. Jeter also announced while accepting his 1990 Tony that he recovered from substance abuse.

Death
On March 30, 2003, Jeter was found dead by Blue in his home in Hollywood Hills, California. He was 50. Blue said that Jeter died of complications after an epileptic seizure. Jeter was cremated, and his ashes were given to Blue.

Filmography

Film

Television

Theater work
 Once in a Lifetime
 G. R. Point
 Cloud 9
 Grand Hotel
 Alice in Concert
 Greater Tuna

References

External links

 
 
 
 

1952 births
2003 deaths
Deaths from epilepsy
American male film actors
American male musical theatre actors
American male stage actors
American male television actors
American male voice actors
People with HIV/AIDS
Drama Desk Award winners
Neurological disease deaths in California
Outstanding Performance by a Supporting Actor in a Comedy Series Primetime Emmy Award winners
American gay actors
People from Lawrenceburg, Tennessee
Theatre World Award winners
Tony Award winners
University of Memphis alumni
Male actors from Memphis, Tennessee
LGBT people from Tennessee
20th-century American singers
20th-century American male actors
21st-century American male actors
20th-century American male singers
20th-century American LGBT people
21st-century American LGBT people